PULSE Foundation is a Bulgarian non-governmental organization, registered on July 7, 1999, under the name “Animus – Pernik”. Since the beginning of 2002, the organization continues its charitable activity under the name “PULSE” – “Positive Personal Skills in Society”. In 2015, PULSE Foundation operated with 19 full-time employees and over 40 youth volunteers.

Mission 
By developing emotional and mental potential of people to create conditions for a harmonious relationship between them, based on equality, understanding and tolerance, leading to successful integration and realization in the society.

Objectives 
The main organizational objectives are:
 To contribute to the intellectual, professional and spiritual development and stimulate the rise of social status of Bulgarian women;
 to protect the rights of people, affected by violence, trafficking and other forms of exploitation, as well as drug addicted and their families, in direction of social integration and personal realization;
 to develop and implement projects and programs, supporting people, affected by violence, trafficking and other forms of exploitation, as well as drug addicted and their families;
 to build and develop specialized programs for recovering people, affected by violence and perpetrators of violence;
 to create and develop training programs for people, working with victims of violence, trafficking and other forms of exploitation, as well as drug addicted and their families;
 to cooperate with the state and municipal institutions, as well as non-governmental organizations, in order to solve problems in priority areas;
 to support youth initiatives and builds youth prevention programs.

For realization of organizational objectives, the Foundation team puts efforts in the following areas: 
 promotes the Foundation's ideas and objectives (events, campaigns, workshops, publication of materials and exchange of experience),
 designs and realizes consultation centers for specialized professional help,
 encourages and cooperates in the process of development of educational and training programs and operates in such programs,
 organizes symposium, conferences, workshops, related to the problems of Bulgarian family,
 establishes a lasting system of cooperation with state and municipal authorities, institutions and non-governmental organizations (both, in the country and abroad),
 makes contact with similar organizations in the country and abroad,
 performs consulting and therapeutic assistance to people, affected by violence, and their families,
 plans and hosts applied for in advance training programs,
 carries out psychological help,
 organizes training of its collaborators,
 publishes materials in the field of its activity,
 works with people, drug addicted to psychoactive substances and injecting, and their families,
 family mediation and child protection.

Services 
The multidisciplinary approach of work, enables the organization to offer: 
 crisis center,
 crisis intervention,
 psychological counseling,
 long-lasting psycho-therapeutic work,
 family counseling and couple therapy,
 legal services and litigation,
 social mediation,
 social assistance,
 occupational therapy,
 groups for sharing own experience,
 supervisions,
 trainings.

Main programs 
PULSE Foundation works in six general programs:
 integration and rehabilitation of persons and children, affected by violence and trafficking, by providing rehabilitation programs. The service works closely with government agencies (Social Assistance Directorate, Police, Court, Prosecution, etc.) and NGOs in the country and abroad, in order to provide protection to people, affected by violence, to identify best practices in the field of case management and to assist court prosecution of perpetrators, as well as effective implementation of Domestic Violence Prevention Act, Child Protection Act and Human Trafficking Prevention Act in Bulgaria;
 violence prevention through informal trainings, youth activities, raising awareness, organizing events, seminars, workshops and conferences;
 crisis center for individuals and children, affected by violence - 13 beds for accommodation, secure environment and a safe shelter for affected by violence, space for reorganization of personality and mobilizing mechanisms to deal with the trauma;
 programs providing services to people, addicted to psychoactive substances and specifically at injecting drug users, working with their families and community in the matter of changing the society victimization attitude;
 prevention of HIV/AIDS among intravenous drug users, projects by the Ministry of Health – “Improving tuberculosis control in Bulgaria” and “Prevention of HIV/AIDS among young people who are at greatest risk (15-24 years old)”;
 drop-in center - low-threshold center including a series of services for the target group (counseling for risky practices, blood and sexually transmitted infections, exchanging needles and syringes, distribution of sterile injection equipment, distribution of printed materials).

Target groups 
 people, affected by physical, psychological and / or sexual abuse, victims or potential victims of violence and / or trafficking, or other forms of exploitation,
 children, living in dysfunctional families, antisocial behavior, homeless children and adolescents in hazardous environments,
 Roma community – a specific subgroup,
 injecting drug users (IDUs),
 adolescents and young people at risk,
 representatives of institutions and practicing experts, working in the area of child development (mostly of justice and law enforcement system in Southwest region),
 general public.

Methodologies and innovative practices 
Methodology and innovative practices are concluded in several priority steps:
 team meetings (administrative and clinical), as well as the regular supervisions, are a leading factor in program implementation,
 the clients of our service have the opportunity to work with different professionals, within the multidisciplinary team of the organization, as well as beyond,
 individual and group psychological work with people, affected by violence,
 individual approach in adolescents and children (at the corresponding emotional maturity) includes special projective techniques (drawing tests, psychodrama, projective work with puppets) and active and committed participation of parents,
 psycho-dramatic model used in group work, allows everyone to get into the “skin” of the other,
 interactive model, in group work, helps people to make contact with each other and to adjust to problematic issues,
 outreach work among IDUs and Roma community,
 case management.

Volunteering 
To support the center activities, the Foundation includes three youth clubs:
 Youth club “To be friends”, working on the program for prevention of violence, since 2000;
 Youth club “P.U.M.A.S.” – “Positive skills of alternative youth in the society ”, which performs activities - outreach and at schools, in order to reach vulnerable groups of young people who have risky sexual practices - since 2004;
 Youth Club at the Youth Bank – city of Pernik, which carries out socially beneficial initiatives.

Volunteers and interns from New Bulgarian University, Sofia University “St. Kliment Ohridski” and Southwest University “Neophyte Rilski” - associates of the core team at the center, as a part of their practice, during their university education.

Membership and partnership 
Developing its activities, the PULSE Foundation works closely with many key organizations, both within the country and internationally.

Within the country, the PULSE Foundation works as:
 regional coordinator of National Network for Children (NNC), for Southwest region,
 co-founder of the Association “Alliance for protection from gender-based violence”,
 and others.
At international level, the PULSE Foundation cooperates with:
 KOK – German NGO network and coordination office, working against human trafficking. KOK aims to promote human rights of people, affected by traffic and / or violence at national and international level;
 European Platform against Trafficking, funded by the European Commission;
 Global Modern Slavery Directory is a directory, the basic idea of which is to provide information on NGOs, dealing with people, affected by trafficking;
 and others.

References

Organizations established in 1999
Organizations based in Bulgaria
1999 establishments in Bulgaria